Tazlina Glacier is a  long glacier in the U.S. state of Alaska. It begins 1.5 miles (2.4 km) north of Mount Cashman and flows north to its terminus one mile (1.6 km) south of Tazlina Lake and 43 miles (69 km) north of Valdez. Tazlina Glacier is the largest northward flowing glacier in the Chugach Mountains. The terminus of the glacier is retreating and thinning. Tazlina is the largest north-flowing glacier in the Chugach Mountains. The glacier is around the Valdez area and is also a popular attraction for tourists. At the foot of the glacier lies the Tazlina Lake and the Tazlina River.

See also
 List of glaciers in the United States
 Tazlina Tower

Cited references

External links

Image

Glaciers of Alaska
Glaciers of Copper River Census Area, Alaska
Glaciers of Unorganized Borough, Alaska